The Groton Bridge Co. was an American construction company.

History

The company was founded in 1877 as Groton Iron Bridge Company, by merger of two firms. It was reorganized and became the Groton Bridge and Manufacturing Company in 1887.  It was purchased by the American Bridge Company in 1899 but was separated in 1902 as Groton Bridge Co. and survived under that name until the 1920s.

The firm was believed to be a subsidiary of American Bridge Co. in 1908 when it installed two Parker truss spans manufactured by American Bridge Co. to complete the Plata Bridge in Puerto Rico.

Notable projects

A number of its works are listed on the U.S. National Register of Historic Places.

Cherokee Bridge, over Tennessee River, built for $69,000.
Allenwood River Bridge, LR 460 over W branch of Susquehanna River, Allenwood, PA and Union, PA (Groton Bridge & Manufacturing Co.), NRHP-listed
Blackford Bridge, Chestnut Rd (Rte 652), Lebanon, Virginia (Groton Bridge and Manufacturing Co), NRHP-listed
Caneadea Bridge, Cty. Rd. over Genesee R., Caneadea, New York (Groton Iron Bridge Co.), NRHP-listed
Goshen Land Company Bridge, built 1890, E of Goshen on VA 746, Goshen, Virginia (Groton Bridge Co.), NRHP-listed
Iron Bridge at Howard Hill Road, Howard Hill Rd. and VT 131, Cavendish, Vermont (Groton Bridge and Manufacturing C), NRHP-listed
Meadow Bridge, spur of North Rd. in Ahelburne across the Androscoggin R., Shelburne, New Hampshire (Groton Bridge and Manufacturing Co.), NRHP-listed
New Sharon Bridge, S of ME 2 over Sandy River, New Sharon, Maine (Groton Bridge Co.), NRHP-listed
Plata Bridge, near Naranjito, Puerto Rico, (Groton Bridge Co.), NRHP-listed
Rorig Bridge, Water St. at Chautauqua Creek, Westfield, New York (Groton Bridge Co.), NRHP-listed
Town Line Bridge, Town Line Rd., Taylor, New York (Groton Bridge Co.), NRHP-listed
West Hickory Bridge, LR 598 over Allegheny River, West Hickory, Pennsylvania (Groton Bridge Co.), NRHP-listed
West Woodstock Bridge, Town Hwy. 50 over the Ottauquechee R., West Woodstock, Vermont (Groton Bridge & Manufacturing Co.), NRHP-listed

References

Bridge companies
Construction and civil engineering companies of the United States
Construction and civil engineering companies established in 1877
American companies established in 1877